Sean Martin Campbell (born 31 December 1974) is an English former footballer who played as a winger in the Football League for Colchester United.

Career

Born in Bristol, Burman began his career with Colchester United after progressing through the club's youth system. He made his debut in a 2–1 defeat to Crewe Alexandra at Gresty Road on 21 August 1993, coming on as a substitute for Simon Betts. He played three further league games for the U's, his final appearance came as a substitute for Steve Brown in a 1–0 victory over Bury at Gigg Lane on 19 March 1994.

After leaving Colchester, Campbell went on to play for a number of Essex-based non-league teams including Chelmsford City, Harwich & Parkeston, Wivenhoe Town and Clacton Town.

References

1974 births
Living people
Footballers from Bristol
English footballers
Association football wingers
Colchester United F.C. players
Chelmsford City F.C. players
Harwich & Parkeston F.C. players
Wivenhoe Town F.C. players
F.C. Clacton players
English Football League players